According to the European Union's Internal Market in Electricity Directive from July 1, 2004, electric power consumers must be informed about the sources from which the electricity they have purchased was generated. Additionally, consumers must be informed about the amount of carbon dioxide emitted into the Earth's atmosphere and/or the quantity of nuclear waste produced as a result of the generation of the electricity that they have purchased.

The exact presentation of the data provided, be that in tables or charts, and the number of types of electricity generation listed are at the discretion of the EU Member States.

Fuel mix disclosure aims to allow customers to differentiate between electricity supply companies and switch supplier as part of the wider programme of EU electricity liberalization.

See also
Energy policy of the European Union
Renewable energy economy

References

External links
European Commission note on fuel mix disclosure

United Kingdom 
 UK Department of Trade and Industry Statistics enabling suppliers to calculate fuel mix
 http://www.electricityinfo.org - Fuel Mix of UK Domestic Electricity Suppliers
 Interactive tool for viewing UK national Fuel Mix data
 Consumer Focus on the Fuel mix disclosure

Italy 
Fuel mix disclosure in Italy (English version)

Energy policies and initiatives of the European Union
European Union law
Electric power in the European Union
Renewable electricity